Volkovyssky Uyezd (Волковысский уезд) was one of the subdivisions of the Grodno Governorate of the Russian Empire. It was situated in the northern part of the governorate. Its administrative centre was Vawkavysk (Volkovysk).

Demographics
At the time of the Russian Empire Census of 1897, Volkovyssky Uyezd had a population of 148,721. Of these, 82.4% spoke Belarusian, 12.4% Yiddish, 2.3% Russian, 2.1% Polish, 0.3% German, 0.2% Ukrainian, 0.1% Bashkir and 0.1% Chuvash as their native language.

References

 
Uezds of Grodno Governorate
Grodno Governorate